The 2013 Newcastle Knights season was the 26th in the club's history. Coached by Wayne Bennett and captained by Kurt Gidley, they competed in the NRL's 2013 Telstra Premiership, finishing the regular season in 7th place (out of 16), thus reaching the finals. The Knights then came within one match of the grand final but were knocked out by eventual premiers, the Sydney Roosters.

Milestones
Round 1: Beau Scott made his debut for the club, after previously playing for the St. George Illawarra Dragons.
Round 1: Jeremy Smith made his debut for the club, after previously playing for the Cronulla-Sutherland Sharks.
Round 1: Travis Waddell made his debut for the club, after previously playing for the Canberra Raiders.
Round 3: David Fa'alogo made his debut for the club, after previously playing for the Huddersfield Giants.
Round 3: Korbin Sims made his NRL debut for the club.
Round 4: Adam Cuthbertson scored his 1st try for the club.
Round 4: Chris Houston played his 100th game for the club.
Round 5: Jarrod Mullen played his 150th game for the club, which was also his 150th career game.
Round 6: Joseph Leilua made his debut for the club, after previously playing for the Sydney Roosters.
Round 7: David Fa'alogo scored his 1st try for the club.
Round 7: James McManus scored his 50th try for the club, which was also his 50th career try.
Round 9: Adam Clydsdale made his NRL debut for the club.
Round 9: Kurt Gidley played his 200th game for the club, which was also his 200th career game.
Round 10: David Fa'alogo played his 150th career game.
Round 10: Joseph Leilua scored his 1st try for the club.
Round 11: Akuila Uate played his 100th game for the club, which was also his 100th career game.
Round 12: Josh Mantellato made his NRL debut for the club, scored his 1st career try and kicked his 1st career goal.
Round 13: Wayne Bennett coached his 670th career game, becoming the most experienced coach ever in the NRL.
Round 14: Craig Gower made his debut for the club, after previously playing for the London Broncos.
Round 16: James McManus scored 4 tries, equalling Darren Albert, Adam MacDougall, Andrew Johns, Cooper Vuna and Akuila Uate's record of most tries scored in a match by 1 player for the Knights.
Round 17: Jeremy Smith played his 150th career game.
Round 19: Craig Gower scored his 1st try for the club.
Round 19: Kade Snowden played his 50th game for the club and scored his 1st try for the club.
Round 21: Neville Costigan played his 50th game for the club.
Round 21: Beau Scott scored his 1st try for the club.
Round 22: Danny Buderus played his 250th game for the club, which was also his 250th career game, breaking Andrew Johns' record of 249 games for most appearances for the Knights.
Round 25: Kurt Gidley kicked his 400th try for the club, which was also his 400th career goal.
Round 26: Danny Buderus kicked his 1st career goal.
Round 26: Jeremy Smith scored his 1st try for the club.
Finals Week 1: Tyrone Roberts played his 50th game for the club, which was also his 50th career game.
Finals Week 2: Matt Hilder played his 200th career game and 100th game for the club.
Finals Week 2: Willie Mason played his 250th career game.

Squad

Transfers and Re-signings

Gains

Losses

Promoted juniors

Change of role

Re-signings

Player contract situations

Ladder

Jerseys and sponsors
In 2013, the Knights' jerseys were made by ISC and their major sponsor was Hunter Ports.

Fixtures

Pre-season trials

Regular season
2013 Regular season fixtures

Statistics

29 players used.

Source:

Representative honours

The following players appeared in a representative match in 2013.

Australia
Darius Boyd
Kurt Gidley

Australian Schoolboys
Sione Mata'utia

Cook Islands
Zane Tetevano

Fiji
Kevin Naiqama
Korbin Sims
Rick Stone (coach)
Akuila Uate

Indigenous All Stars
Timana Tahu
Travis Waddell

Italy
Josh Mantellato
Kade Snowden

Junior Kiwis
Joseph Tapine

New South Wales
James McManus

New South Wales City
Adam Cuthbertson

New South Wales Country
Willie Mason
Alex McKinnon
James McManus
Akuila Uate

New South Wales Residents
Adrian Davis
Matt Hilder
Josh Mantellato
Peter Mata'utia
Kevin Naiqama

New South Wales under-16s
Jack Cogger
Brock Lamb

New South Wales under-18s
Sione Mata'utia

NRL All Stars
Wayne Bennett (coach)
Willie Mason
Akuila Uate

Papua New Guinea
Neville Costigan (captain)

Queensland
Darius Boyd

Samoa
David Fa'alogo
Joseph Leilua

Tonga
Siuatonga Likiliki

Individual honours

Teams and squads
New South Wales Cup Team of the Year
Josh Mantellato
Peter Mata'utia

Dally M awards
Top Try-scorer
James McManus (19 tries)

Newcastle Knights awards

Player of the Year
National Rugby League (NRL) Player of the Year: Darius Boyd
New South Wales Cup Player of the Year: Kevin Naiqama
National Youth Competition (NYC) Player of the Year: Adam Clydsdale

Players' Player
National Rugby League (NRL) Players' Player: Danny Buderus
New South Wales Cup Players' Player: Matt Hilder
National Youth Competition (NYC) Players' Player: Jake Mamo

Coach's Award
National Rugby League (NRL) Coach's Award: Robbie Rochow
New South Wales Cup Coach's Award: Mitchell Frei
National Youth Competition (NYC) Coach's Award: Joseph Tapine

Brian Carlson Club-Andrew Johns Medal
Sione Mata'utia

References

Newcastle Knights seasons
Newcastle Knights season